Jenny Lynn (1971/2 – July 18, 2021) was an International Federation of BodyBuilders (IFBB) professional figure competitor.

Lynn began her career in 2000 as a fitness competitor and then crossed over when the figure category was created in 2003. She won consecutive Figure Olympia titles in 2006 and 2007. She retired from competing following the 2009 Olympia competition.

Lynn died on July 18, 2021, from a seizure, aged 49.

Contest history
2002 IFBB Arnold Classic And Internationals - 12th
2002 IFBB New York Pro Fitness - 5th
2002 IFBB Pittsburgh Pro Fitness - 7th
2002 IFBB GNC Show Of Strength - 5th
2003 IFBB Figure International - 1st
2003 IFBB Night of Champions, Figure - 2nd
2003 IFBB Figure Olympia - 3rd
2003 IFBB Pittsburgh Pro Figure, Figure - 1st
2003 IFBB Show of Strength Pro Championship, Figure - 1st
2004 IFBB Figure International - 1st
2004 IFBB Figure Olympia - 2nd
2004 IFBB Show of Strength Pro Championship, Figure - 1st
2005 IFBB Figure International - 1st
2005 IFBB Figure Olympia - 2nd
2005 IFBB Sacramento Pro Championships, Figure - 1st
2005 IFBB San Francisco Pro Championships, Figure - 1st
2006 IFBB Colorado Pro Championships, Figure - 2nd
2006 IFBB Pittsburgh Pro Figure, Figure - 1st
2006 IFBB Figure Olympia - 1st
2007 IFBB Figure Olympia - 1st
2008 IFBB Figure Olympia - 4th
2009 IFBB Jacksonville Pro - 3rd
2009 IFBB Europa - 1st
2009 IFBB Figure Olympia - 7th

See also
List of female fitness & figure competitors

References

External links
Photo at www.hardfitness.com
Bio at www.bodybuilding.com (archived copy)

1970s births
Year of birth uncertain
Place of birth missing
2021 deaths
American female bodybuilders
Fitness and figure competitors
People from Petaluma, California
21st-century American women